Derrin R. Owens is an American politician and a Republican member of the Utah State Senate who represents Senate district 27 and previously district 24. He previously served Utah House of Representatives representing District 58 from August 10, 2015 to December 31, 2020.

Early life and education 
Owens was born in the Show Low, Arizona and is the eighth of nine children. After serving a mission for the Church of Jesus Christ of Latter-day Saints in Chicago, Illinois, his family moved to Ephraim, Utah. He received a bachelor's degree in Social Science from Southern Utah University. He received a master's degree in Education from Grand Canyon University. He is now a school counselor who works closely with the students at Juab High School. He currently lives in Fountain Green, Utah with his wife Heather and five children.

Political career 
2015 Owens was appointed by Governor Gary Herbert after the resignation of former Representative Jon Cox.

During the 2016 General Session Owens served on the House Business and Labor Committee, House Natural Resources, Agriculture, and Environment Committee, and Higher Education Appropriations Subcommittee. During the interim he serves on the Business and Labor Interim Committee and the Transportation Interim Committee.

In 2020, he announced he would instead run for the Utah State Senate, winning the November election with 90.2% of the vote, against Independent American Party of Utah candidate Warren Rogers.

In 2021, he was denounced for 'inappropriate and offensive' remarks regarding black people during a Utah senate hearing.

2016 sponsored legislation 

In 2016, Owens floor sponsored SB 144 Dead Domestic Animal Disposal Amendments.

References

External links 
 Official page at the Utah State Legislature
 Profile at Project Vote Smart
 Derrin Owens at Ballotpedia
 Derrin Owens Twitter

Living people
Year of birth missing (living people)
Latter Day Saints from Utah
Republican Party members of the Utah House of Representatives
Republican Party Utah state senators
21st-century American politicians
People from Navajo County, Arizona
People from Ephraim, Utah
People from Fountain Green, Utah